The Jiahu symbols consist of 16 distinct markings on prehistoric artifacts found in Jiahu, a neolithic Peiligang culture site found in Henan, China, and excavated in 1989. The Jiahu symbols are dated to around 6000 BC. The archaeologists who made the original finds believed the markings to be similar in form to some characters used in the much later oracle bone script (e.g. similar markings of  "eye",  "sun; day"), but most doubt that the markings represent systematic writing. A 2003 report in Antiquity interpreted them "not as writing itself, but as features of a lengthy period of sign-use which led eventually to a fully-fledged system of writing." The earliest known body of writing in the oracle bone script dates much later to the reign of the late Shang dynasty king Wu Ding, which started in about c. 1250 BC or 1200 BC.

See also
Gudi (instrument)
Neolithic signs in China
Undeciphered writing systems

References

Prehistoric China
Proto-writing
Undeciphered writing systems